Ferdinand Zvonimir Maria Balthus Keith Michael Otto Antal Bahnam Leonhard von Habsburg-Lothringen (born 21 June 1997 in Salzburg) is an Austrian motor racing driver and heir apparent to the headship of the House of Habsburg-Lorraine. He is currently driving in the FIA World Endurance Championship with Team WRT and European Le Mans Series with Prema.

Habsburg won the 24 Hours of Le Mans and the FIA World Endurance Championship in the LMP2 class alongside Charles Milesi and Robin Frijns in 2021.

Early life and family 
Ferdinand Habsburg was born on 21 June 1997 to Karl von Habsburg and Francesca von Habsburg. A  member of the House of Habsburg-Lorraine, his paternal grandparents were Otto von Habsburg, the last crown prince of Austria-Hungary, and Princess Regina of Saxe-Meiningen. His maternal grandparents are Baron Hans Heinrich Thyssen-Bornemisza and Fiona Campbell-Walter, descendant of the Campbell baronets.

Habsburg was baptised on 20 September 1997 in Zagreb by Cardinal Franjo Kuharić. His godparents were his uncle Georg von Habsburg; Alois-Konstantin, 9th Prince of Löwenstein-Wertheim-Rosenberg; Margarita Gómez-Acebo y Cejuela; and Agnes Husslein (born Countess of Arco). He was also given the traditional Croatian name Zvonimir.

He is the brother of Eleonore von Habsburg and Gloria von Habsburg. His brother-in-law (Eleanore's husband) is former driver Jérôme d'Ambrosio.

Ferdinand is the heir apparent to the headship of the House of Habsburg-Lorraine, currently held by his father. He is informally titled as an Imperial and Royal Archduke of Austria. However, the titles and honorifics are unofficial as Austria is a republic with all royal titles being legally abolished in 1918.

Early career

Karting
Habsburg began his racing career at the age of 14 with the Austrian team, Speedworld Academy. He has worn racing number 62 since the beginning of his karting career. In 2014 after four years spent in ROTAX Junior category, winning multiple championship titles, he switched to Rotax DD2. He also qualified three times for the Rotax Max Challenge Grand Finals, scoring a best result of eleventh in 2013.

Formula Renault 1.6 NEC
In 2014, Habsburg made his début in single seaters, taking part in the Formula Renault 1.6 NEC Championship with Lechner Racing. He finished fourth with a 100% finishing rate in 15 races.

Toyota Racing Series
For 2015, Habsburg contested New Zealand's Toyota Racing Series in January and February 2015 with Victory Motor Racing, finishing 11th in the championship and 5th in the rookie class with two podium finishes. He would return to the series with Giles Motorsport for 2016 and finished fourth in the championship behind Lando Norris, Jehan Daruvala and Brendon Leitch with four podium finishes, which included his first win in car racing in the season opener at Mike Pero Motorsport Park.

Habsburg contested his final season in the series in 2017, this time driving for M2 Competition. The Austrian finished the campaign in eighth place, scoring two podiums.

Formula Renault 2.0 NEC
For 2015, Habsburg decided to switch to the Formula Renault Northern European Cup with Fortec Motorsports. Having only raced in the first five rounds in the series with a best finish of fifth at his home event at the Red Bull Ring, the Austrian ended up 19th in the standings.

Euroformula Open Championship 
Habsburg made his debut in the Euroformula Open Championship in the 2015 season finale at the Circuit de Barcelona-Catalunya, where he finished both races in the top ten.

The following year Habsburg committed to the series full-time, racing for Drivex School. Having lost ground to the more experienced title-favourite Leonardo Pulcini during the first few rounds, Habsburg was able to achieve his first race win in the series at the Circuit Paul Ricard. He followed that up by scoring seven podiums across the five remaining rounds, which included a win in Barcelona, and finished second in the standings, with twelve podiums from just 16 races to his credit.

FIA Formula 3 European Championship

2017 
For 2017, Habsburg stepped up to the FIA European F3 Championship, racing for Carlin. He had a highly successful season, taking four podiums and a first series win at Spa. However his most impressive drive came in the end of year Macau Grand Prix. In the main race, he battled hard for the lead with Brazilian Sérgio Sette Câmara, but was unable to pass. On the final lap, Habsburg took the lead around the outside of the final corner at Fisherman's Bend, but braked too late and understeered into the barriers on the exit of the corner, with Sette Câmara doing exactly the same thing, handing the race win to Câmara's teammate Dan Ticktum. Habsburg eventually limped across the line fourth despite broken front suspension. Nonetheless, the Austrian would gain much praise from both his team boss and journalists for his final lap maneuver, along with his great season as a whole.

2018 
He returned to the series in 2018 with Carlin, this time partnering Jehan Daruvala, Sacha Fenestraz, Nikita Troitskiy and Ameya Vaidyanathan. However, Habsburg was unable to find the form from the previous year, scoring just a lone podium at Misano and finishing 13th in the championship.

Sportscar career

Deutsche Tourenwagen Masters

2019 

In 2019, Habsburg signed for R-Motorsport II to race the Aston Martin Vantage DTM in the Deutsche Tourenwagen Masters. He scored two points finishes in Circuit Zolder and the Norisring and ended up 18th in the driver's championship.

2020 
For the 2020 season Habsburg made the switch to Audi Sport Team WRT racing the Audi RS5 Turbo DTM. This season was comparatively successful for Habsburg as he secured 10 points positions, one of which was a podium in Circuit Zolder. This meant that Habsburg finished tenth in the driver's championship with 68 points, beating both of his teammates Fabio Scherer and Harrison Newey.

eSports

2020 
In 2020, Habsburg competed in the 24 Hours of Le Mans Virtual with Mahle Racing, driving the 2018 Aston Martin Vantage GTE alongside former IndyCar Series driver Robert Wickens and sim-racers Jimmy Broadbent and Kevin Rotting. They classified in 46th place.

Endurance racing

2021 
Habsburg started his 2021 campaign by racing in the Asian Le Mans Series with G-Drive Racing. Together with his teammates Ye Yifei and Rene Binder he won the drivers' championship, taking two wins along the way. Alongside this, Habsburg raced with High Class Racing in the 2021 24 Hours of Daytona alongside Robert Kubica, Dennis Andersen, and Anders Fjordbach. However, they retired from the race due to a gearbox failure.

On 26 February it was confirmed he would compete in the FIA World Endurance Championship for Team WRT alongside Robin Frijns and Charles Milesi, driving an Oreca 07 in the LMP2 class. During the first round in the 6 Hours of Spa-Francorchamps, Habsburg and his team finished tenth and in the following race, the 8 Hours of Portimão, his team finished in fourth position. However, it was in the next race, the 6 Hours of Monza that Habsburg clinched his first LMP2 podium, finishing in second place. In round four, that being the 24 Hours of Le Mans, Habsburg and his Team WRT teammates clinched a dramatic LMP2 class win after their sister Team WRT car suffered a throttle Sensor failure on the final lap whilst in the lead of the race. After a two-month long break the trio won the 6 Hours of Bahrain. The following weekend, Habsburg, Frijns and Milesi clinched the LMP2 title after scoring a third consecutive victory in the series at the 8-hour race at the same venue. Habsburg also became the first Austrian to win the LMP2 title in the World Endurance Championship.

2022 
The following year, Habsburg returned to the WEC, driving the 41 car for RealTeam by WRT with Rui Andrade and Norman Nato. Together, the team achieved three podiums, which included a win at the 6 Hours of Monza, and finished fourth in the standings.

Parallel to his WEC campaign, the Austrian competed for Prema Racing in the European Le Mans Series. The team started the season in controlling fashion, winning the season opener at Paul Ricard, after which Habsburg described himself as "honoured", and taking victory in Imola despite Lorenzo Colombo having to serve two drive-through penalties for a pair of separate infringements. After a fifth place in Monza, Habsburg and his teammates Colombo and Louis Delétraz took yet another victory at Barcelona to extend their championship advantage. Another podium came in the penultimate race at Spa, before the team clinched the title with a victory at the finale in Portimão, meaning that Habsburg and Delétraz claimed the ELMS drivers' title.

2023 
The Austrian driver remained with Team WRT for the 2023 WEC season, this time partnering Sean Gelael and reuniting with Robin Frijns.

Art car
Together with his mother Francesca von Habsburg, Habsburg launched a unique interpretation of racing and art in 2014. The famous Swiss designer group, Lang-Baumann, designed and painted his race car.

Karting record

Karting career summary

Racing record

Career summary

† As von Habsburg was a guest driver, he was ineligible to score championship points. 
‡ Points only counted towards the Michelin Endurance Cup, and not the overall LMP2 Championship.

Complete Formula Renault 1.6 NEC results 
(key) (Races in bold indicate pole position) (Races in italics indicate fastest lap)

Complete Toyota Racing Series results
(key) (Races in bold indicate pole position) (Races in italics indicate fastest lap)

Complete Formula Renault 2.0 Northern European Cup results 
(key) (Races in bold indicate pole position) (Races in italics indicate fastest lap)

Complete Eurocup Formula Renault 2.0 results 
(key) (Races in bold indicate pole position) (Races in italics indicate fastest lap)

† As Habsburg was a guest driver, he was ineligible for points.

Complete Euroformula Open Championship results 
(key) (Races in bold indicate pole position; races in italics indicate points for the fastest lap of top ten finishers)

† As von Habsburg was a guest driver, he was ineligible to score championship points.

Complete Macau Grand Prix results

Complete FIA Formula 3 European Championship results
(key) (Races in bold indicate pole position) (Races in italics indicate fastest lap)

Complete IMSA SportsCar Championship results
(key) (Races in bold indicate pole position; races in italics indicate fastest lap)

† Points only counted towards the Michelin Endurance Cup, and not the overall LMP2 Championship.

Complete Deutsche Tourenwagen Masters results
(key) (Races in bold indicate pole position) (Races in italics indicate fastest lap)

† Driver did not finish, but was classified as he completed 90% of the race distance.

Complete European Le Mans Series results
(key) (Races in bold indicate pole position; results in italics indicate fastest lap)

Complete FIA World Endurance Championship results
(key) (Races in bold indicate pole position) (Races in italics indicate fastest lap)

Complete 24 Hours of Le Mans results

References

External links
 Personal website
 

1997 births
Living people
Sportspeople from Salzburg
Austrian Roman Catholics
Ferdinand Zvonimir von
Knights of the Golden Fleece of Austria
Austrian racing drivers
Hungarian racing drivers
Toyota Racing Series drivers
Formula Renault 2.0 NEC drivers
Formula Renault Eurocup drivers
Austrian princes
Formula Renault 2.0 Alps drivers
Euroformula Open Championship drivers
FIA Formula 3 European Championship drivers
24 Hours of Daytona drivers
International GT Open drivers
WeatherTech SportsCar Championship drivers
Blancpain Endurance Series drivers
Deutsche Tourenwagen Masters drivers
FIA World Endurance Championship drivers
24 Hours of Le Mans drivers
European Le Mans Series drivers
Asian Le Mans Series drivers
Carlin racing drivers
Walter Lechner Racing drivers
Drivex drivers
Prema Powerteam drivers
M2 Competition drivers
Motopark Academy drivers
Jota Sport drivers
R-Motorsport drivers
ART Grand Prix drivers
Audi Sport drivers
G-Drive Racing drivers
W Racing Team drivers
Fortec Motorsport drivers
Aston Martin Racing drivers
Starworks Motorsport drivers